Groșii may refer to several places in Romania:

 Groșii Noi, a village in Bârzava Commune, Arad County
 Groșii Țibleșului, a commune in Maramureș County

See also
 Groși (disambiguation)
 Groș (disambiguation)
 Groșani (disambiguation)
 Grosu